Carlos González Cruchaga (June 8, 1921 in Santiago, Chile – September 21, 2008) was a Chilean Bishop of the Roman Catholic Church.

Cruchaga was ordained a priest on September 23, 1944. He was appointed bishop of the Diocese of Talca on January 4, 1967 and ordained a bishop May 7, 1967. Cruchaga remained bishop of the Diocese of Talca until his retirement on December 12, 1996.

References

External links
Catholic Hierarchy
Talca Diocese
Obituary

1921 births
2008 deaths
20th-century Roman Catholic bishops in Chile
People from Santiago
Roman Catholic bishops of Talca